Philipp Habegger (born 23 July 1978) is a Swiss mathematician and a professor of mathematics at the University of Basel who works in Diophantine geometry.

Early life and education
Habegger was born on 23 July 1978. He received his Ph.D. under the supervision of David Masser at the University of Basel in 2007.

Career
From 2008 to 2010, Habegger was a ETH Fellow at ETH Zurich. He moved to the University of Zurich for a lectureship position in 2010. In 2013, he was a von Neumann Fellow at the Institute for Advanced Study. As of 2021, Habegger is a professor of mathematics at the University of Basel.

Research
Habegger's research focuses on height functions and their applications to unlikely intersections.

Selected publications

References

External links
 Personal website

21st-century Swiss mathematicians
University of Basel alumni
Arithmetic geometers
Living people
Academic staff of the University of Basel
1978 births
Academic staff of the University of Zurich
Academic staff of ETH Zurich